Auttapon Prakopkong (better known as M The Star, romanization variants: Attapon or Attapol or Attaphol from Thai) is a Thai singer and winner of the popular reality TV program The Star 2.

Biography
He was born September 28, 1978, in Chiang Mai (Northern Thailand). Although his parents were divorced when he was only two years old, his strong determination to be a good person was always kept in his mind. This might be caused by his mother's advice as a teacher. As a teenager, he had a part-time job as a singer at the Public House in Chiang Mai. It led him to his goal of being a professional singer.

The first challenge came when he applied to join "The Star 1" together with his friends; Jeiw-Piyanuth and New-Napassorn. Both of the girls went to the final round but he was knocked out in the first round. Again, his strong determination to be a singer still continued as he later joined "The Star 2" in the next year and was the winner by getting 50.81% of the audience's vote in the final round. He finally achieved one of his dreams to be the winner of The Star. Later, he had a chance to release the debut album with the huge entertainment company in Thailand, GMM Grammy.
 
He decided to drop out of his first year at Payap University to focus on his singing career. In the future, he would like to have further education in the music field abroad.

Discography
Album "Your stars your songs vol.1" (Released November 23, 2004)
Album "Your stars your songs vol.2" (Released November 23, 2004)
VCD The Star2 Concert + bonus track (Released November 23, 2004)
Single "krob krua bai mai" for the commercial of Bangchak co. ltd in 2005 
Single "barp na" Theme song of Thai drama named "proong ni mai sai tee ja rak kan" included in the Original Soundtrack Drama album. (Released August 6, 2005)
Single "pee mai chai pom pee kor pood dai" feat. Nick-Ronavee (second to the Star 2 winner) included in Nick-Ronavee's debut album (Released in 2005)
Album "M-Auttapon" his debut album released July 12, 2005.
The famous singles are "bok rak bao bao" "khao mai rak rao" and "ther khong mai roo". "Ther khong mai roo" was selected to be Drama; Wi marn sine  Theme Song in 2005.
Single "hua ork deau kan" feat. R-Anattapon (The winner of the Star 3) included in R-Anattapon's debut album released in 2006.
Album "M The Second"–2nd album released September 19, 2006
The famous singles are "ya ron tua" "kon buang lang" and "luem mai pen"
Single "ya ron tua" (M The Second) is collected to "GMM Grammy Best of the Year 2006" Album. (released in 2006)
Single "khao mai rak rao", " tang mod jai" (debut album; M Attapon) "luem mai pen", "ya ron tua", and "khon buang lang" (the 2nd album; M The Second) are collected to The Star together Album released in 2006.
Single "ya pai sia nam ta" and "klap mai dai pai mai teung" are included in Right The Celebration Album. This is a part of 25 Years of Nitipong Hornark – The Celebration Album (released June 2, 2007)
Single "hua jai mai fang hed pol" ; the first single (released August 1, 2007) from the third album (planned to be released in September 2007)
Album "M My Way" 3rd album released in September 2007.
Single "Ther poo pen jao kong hua jai" released August 24, 2007) from M My Way, selected as theme song in Drama "Leh ku larb" Thai TV Channel 3. It was on air on August 26, 2007.

Concerts
"ID.F.L.Y. Fullfill Love Young Victim" at Thunder Dome, Muangthong Tanee, Thailand, March 4, 2006
"The Star 3" at Impact Arena, Muangthong Tanee, Thailand, April 30, 2007
"Thai Festival" at Yoyogi park, Harajuku, Tokyo, Japan, May 12–13, 2006
"Thai Festival" at Osaka, Japan, September 16–18, 2006
"HP color of love Concert" (together with Palmy) at BEC Tero Hall, Thailand, February 14, 2007
"Thai Festival" at Phanomphen, Cambodia, May 19, 2007
Be the guest of "Greenwave Concert" (Theme : Cover Night 25 years of Di-Nitipong) at Thammasart University, Thailand, July 8, 2007
Be the guest of "25 years of Nitipong Concert" at Impact Arena, Thailand on August 25, 2007
Be the guest of "Greenwave Concert" (Theme; number 10-The Lost Love Song) at Central World, Thailand, September 28–29, 2007

References

External links
 https://web.archive.org/web/20181102042134/http://m-fanclub.com/
 http://www.grammy.co.th
 https://web.archive.org/web/20110707154922/http://www.aratist.com/index.php?module=artists&action=artistinfo&artistid=A0428
 https://web.archive.org/web/20080930224058/http://www.scenario.co.th/forum/viewforum.php?f=19

Auttapon Prakopkong
Auttapon Prakopkong
Singing talent show winners
Auttapon Prakopkong
1978 births
Living people